The 2006 Women's Australian Hockey League was the 14th edition women's field hockey tournament. The tournament was held between 7 April – 14 May 2006.

WA Diamonds won the tournament for the third time after defeating QLD Scorchers 4–2 in the final. Canberra Strikers finished in third place after defeating NSW Arrows 2–1 in the third and fourth place playoff.

Participating Teams

 Canberra Strikers
 NSW Arrows
 Territory Pearls
 QLD Scorchers
 Adelaide Suns
 Tassie Van Demons
 Azuma Vipers
 WA Diamonds

Competition format
The 2006 Women's Australian Hockey League consisted of a single round robin format, followed by classification matches.

Teams from all 8 states and territories competed against one another throughout the pool stage. At the conclusion of the pool stage, the top four ranked teams progressed to the semi-finals, while the bottom four teams continued to the classification stage.

The first four rounds of the pool stage comprised two-legged fixtures based on aggregate scores to determine point allocation.

Results

Preliminary round

Pool

Fixtures

Classification round

Fifth to eighth place classification

Crossover

Seventh and eighth place

Fifth and sixth place

First to fourth place classification

Semi-finals

Third and fourth place

Final

Awards

Statistics

Final standings

Goalscorers

References

External links

2006
2006 in Australian women's field hockey
Sports competitions in Adelaide